Sergey Viktorovich Golubev (born January 28, 1978) is a retired Russian bobsledder who competed from 2000 to 2006. He won two medals in the four-man event at the FIBT World Championships with a silver in 2005 and a bronze in 2003.

Golubev also finished ninth in the four-man event at the 2006 Winter Olympics in Turin. Shortly after the Olympics Golubev suffered a car accident in which he sustained injuries which forced him to retire from competition.

References
 
 
 Bobsleigh four-man world championship medalists since 1930

1978 births
Bobsledders at the 2002 Winter Olympics
Bobsledders at the 2006 Winter Olympics
Living people
Olympic bobsledders of Russia
Russian male bobsledders